Flipper and Lopaka is an Australian animated series produced by the Yoram Gross companies: Yoram Gross-Village Roadshow (in Season 1) and Yoram Gross-EM.TV (in Seasons 2 and 3). It has previously aired on Australia's Seven Network at various times and has also aired on Australia's ABC3, a channel dedicated to children's television programs.

Setting
The series takes place on the Millhouse island of Iloka. The islanders survive without the use of modern technology, building huts out of bamboo and fern and eating various fruits found on the island floor. Beneath the surrounding ocean lies Quetzo, a sunken Millhouse island now home to many sea creatures, which unlike Iloka, has many modern influences. The series follows Lopaka, a young Polynesian boy who has the mysterious power to communicate with sea creatures and hold his breath for long periods underwater. He is accompanied alongside his adventures with his many sea-faring friends, including the witty and friendly dolphin, Flipper. Lopaka, Flipper and their friends must work together to thwart the plans of the nefarious Dexter, an octopus wanting to claim Quetzo as his own, and keep peace amongst the underwater domain.

Characters

All seasons
Lopaka - (voiced by Jamie Oxenbould) an 11-year-old Polynesian boy, referred to in the show as a menehune, who has the power to converse with sea creatures and to hold his breath underwater longer than possible. He was rescued from drowning as a child by Flipper, and they've been best friends ever since. The islanders of Iloka often wonder where Lopaka disappears to every episode, but he usually manages to avoid speaking the truth (up until Season 3). He wears a red skirt, and an arm band (which all the males wear on Iloka). Lopaka is a very loyal friend, to sea creatures and islanders alike and has shown a strong sense of courage time and time again. He has fluffy brown hair that reaches below his ears, and black eyes.

Flipper - (voiced by Keith Scott) Lopaka's best friend, Flipper is a quick-witted, agile, loyal and friendly bottlenose dolphin, whose parents are the rulers of Quetzo. When trouble arises in the underwater domain, the sea-creature citizens turn to Flipper as their leader. Flipper has a light blue underbelly, with a darker blue back. He is known as the most trusted sea creature in Quetzo, and does his best to help everybody he can.

Ottie, Ray and Puffy - Ottie, a sea otter, Ray, a manta ray and Puffy, a blowfish, are Flipper's good friends, and they usually accompany him and Lopaka in keeping Quetzo safe. Ottie is the only one of the three who can go on land, making him a valuable asset when Lopaka isn't around to help. Ray is kindhearted, and acts as a central motivator of the group, and Puffy, albeit insecure about himself, uses his ability to puff himself out to his advantage.

Dexter - Dexter is a giant, purple octopus whose main goal is to rule Quetzo. He is deceiving, manipulative, pompous and acts as the main antagonist to the story. Underneath his nefarious outlook, when faced with danger he becomes very scared and cowardly. No matter how many times Flipper saves his life, Dexter will always make up a new plan to try and destroy him. He likes to praise himself for his 'excellence', however he isn't the brightest sea creature around. 

Serge - Serge is a sea snake who acts as the 'brains' to Dexter's motivation. He is bright green, with a devious and sharp mind. Even though Serge is to credit for the ideas that are made to destroy Flipper, whenever they go wrong, Dexter puts the blame on him for everything.

Finn, Nip, and Bubbles - Three great white sharks who work for Dexter as brainless minions. 

Dolores - Dexter's sister. Dolores dislikes Dexter, as she thinks of him as very selfish, and she is the only one Dexter truly fears. She occasionally has him babysit her daughter, Inky. She becomes friendly with Flipper and his friends and eventually becomes a famous superstar in Seadom.

Inky - Dolore's daughter and Dexter's niece. Unlike her uncle Inky is nice and is a friend of Flipper's (which he disapproves).

Nola - A young Polynesian girl who wears a simple Yellow dress and a leg bracelet around her right foot. It's also suggested she might be an orphan.

Professor Kerava - Chief Kepuna's friend and is one of the eldest citizens of Iloka that lived here. He remembers almost everything about Iloka by sharing stories with the chief. Kerava is usually known to tell stories to the citizens of Iloka. Kerava turns into a sea turtle every time when Flipper and his allies meet him. However, his name is changed as "Calabash". He is also helpful to other characters. Later in the series he becomes Flipper and Lopaka's spirit guide.

Bomana Lopaka's father. Bomana is very strict, alongside Chief Kepuna and his wife. He cares for Lopaka about what he is supposed to do and always tells him to follow him.

Bolo - a young fat Polynesian boy who is the Chief's son and likes to mess around with Lopaka. He wears a blue skirt.

Chief Kapona - The chief of the village and Bolo's father.

 Mia  - The Chief's wife and Bolo's mother. She's very strike with her husband and son.

Season 2
Professor Troy, Spike and Goose - Professor Troy is a talented scientist who wants to find out the history of Quetzo and Iloka, and the reason that it sank. She is good hearted and her son, Spike, is friends with Lopaka and is surprised the Milihune can get along without 20th century essentials. He tries teaching them about it by playing along with them. Goose, Troy's off-beat assistant is a young man of few words; every time he speaks, he does so with an accent. For example, if he were to say "Help me!", he would say it slowly, in a low voice. He wears an aqua vest and jeans.

Season 3
 Captain Barnibus Crab, Kim, Simon - Captain Crab is a short, modern-day pirate who has come to the waters of Iloka to search for Neptune's Statue and Neptune's Trident. His barefoot niece, 18 or so year-old Kim has come to assist him, and also gain pirating experience. Kim is an eager pirate, and is the technical wiz of the ship. Simon on the other hand, is a large deck hand/chef. He is accident prone, and will commit piracy, but he is really a gentle giant.

Ultra - Ultra is a pink dolphin, who was taken from her parents as a baby. She grew up in a science lab, and was taken with the pirates to search the ocean floor. After a few incidents, Ultra proves herself a true, worthy companion, and Flipper gladly takes her into the group. Later in the series, Ultra finds her parents, along with a little sister, Delta.

List of episodes

Season 1 (1999)

Season 2 (2000)

Season 3 (2003-05)

References

Citations

Sources 

 http://www.yoramgrossfilms.com.au/completed/flipper.html
 http://www.keyframeonline.com/Animation/Flipper_and_Lopaka/689/
 http://thecia.com.au/reviews/f/flipper-and-lopaka.shtml

External links

Flipper and Lopaka at ABC3

1990s Australian animated television series
2000s Australian animated television series
1999 Australian television series debuts
2005 Australian television series endings
Australian children's animated adventure television series
Australian children's animated comedy television series
Seven Network original programming
Australian Broadcasting Corporation original programming
Television series by Miramax Television
Fictional dolphins
Fictional octopuses
Animated television series about children
Animated television series about mammals
Animated television series about fish
Television series about snakes
Television shows set in Oceania